Ținutul Suceava was one of the ten Romanian administrative regions (ținuturi) created on August 14, 1938, as a part of King Carol II's administrative reform. From August 14, 1938, to June 28, 1940, it included the whole of Bukovina, a county of Bessarabia (Hotin) and a county of Moldavia (Dorohoi). It was named after the river Suceava. Its administrative capital was the city of Cernăuți. After its northern part (the counties Cernăuți, Storojineț and Hotin, as well as parts of the counties Rădăuți and Dorohoi) was ceded to the USSR on June 28, 1940, Ținutul Suceava was restructured on September 16, 1940, when Baia county became a part of the region, and abolished only a few days latter, on September 22, 1940. Ținutul Suceava had two governors: Gheorghe Alexianu (August 14, 1938 – February 1, 1939) and Gheorghe Flondor (February 1, 1939 – September 22, 1940). Alexianu's mandate was marked by the suppression of ethnic minority and Jewish rights.

Coat of arms
The coat of arms consists of seven pallets, four of gules and three of azure, representing the former seven counties (județe) of Greater Romania which it included (of the total 71). Over the pallets there is a castle, representing the medieval citadel in Suceava.

Constitutive counties
The administrative reform of August 14, 1938, kept the existing 71 counties, but conveyed the marrow of their prerogatives to the news regions. 
 Câmpulung County
 Cernăuți County
 Dorohoi County
 Hotin County
 Rădăuți County
 Suceava County
 Storojineț County

See also
 Bukovina Governorate
 Historical administrative divisions of Romania
 Chernivtsi Oblast
 Nord-Est (development region)
 History of Romania
 History of Ukraine

References

External links
 Map

 
Bessarabia
Bukovina
Suceava
1938 establishments in Romania
1940 disestablishments in Romania
States and territories established in 1938
States and territories disestablished in 1940